"Jalousie" is a song by French singer Priscilla from her third album Une fille comme moi. The song reached number 21 in France.

It was the third and last single from that album. The album came out in February 2004, and the single seven months later, in September.

Track listing

Charts

References 

2004 songs
2004 singles
Priscilla Betti songs
Jive Records singles
Songs written by Bertrand Châtenet
Songs written by Philippe Osman